405 may refer to:

 Interstate 405 (disambiguation), several United States freeways
There are other highways numbered 405, see the List of highways numbered 405
 Area code 405, which serves Central Oklahoma
 "The 405", a local nickname for Oklahoma City and its metropolitan area, taken from the area code
 405-line television system
 405 (HTTP status code)
 Peugeot 405,  1980s French automobile
 The 405 (magazine), a UK-based music and culture website
 Bristol 405, 1950s British automobile
 405 (film), 3-minute short released in May 2000 by Bruce Branit and Jeremy Hunt
 "405", a song by Death Cab for Cutie from their 2000 album We Have the Facts and We're Voting Yes
 "The 405", a song by Isaac Hayes off his Raw and Refined album
 .405 Winchester, or .405 WCF, a firearm cartridge